Westminster High School is a public high school located in Westminster, California. It is part of the Huntington Beach Union High School District. It is currently the only school within the Huntington Beach Union High School District to have a working farm as well as the largest school in Orange County. Westminster High School has a rivalry against Ocean View High School, where both schools battle it off during football season in the “Battle of the Bugle”.

Overview
The school's name and traditions are derived from Westminster Abbey in London, England. The school colors of red, black and white are those of the Queen's Guard, and the school's mascot, Leo the lion, is a national animal of England. The student government, called The House of Lords, also represents the government of England. Each ASB member serves under a minister position while the board of ASB serves under specific names representing that of England's government. The ASB president is referred to as the Prime Minister, ASB Vice President to Chancellor, Secretary to Minister of Records, and Treasurer to Exchequer.

The school opened on September 10, 1959 following population growth associated with the incorporation of Westminster in 1957. The school serves students from Johnson Middle School, Warner Middle School, and Stacey Middle School. In 2002 the school completed its construction and was the first school in the Orange County area that has an elevator to serve handicapped students for their two-story building located on the North side of campus. The new Social Studies wing can use 100% "natural lighting" making reading easier than fluorescent lighting. The new stadium is top notch and boasts a professional level football and soccer field along with a nine-lane polyurethane track and bleachers that hold 5,500 fans.

Demographics

According to U.S. News & World Report, 95% of Westminster's student body is "of color," with 78% of the student body coming from an economically disadvantaged household, determined by student eligibility for California's Reduced-price meal program.

Sports
Westminster High School athletes compete in the Golden West League of CIF's Southern Section.

Westminster Boys' Basketball won the Golden West League title in 2014 and 2015.

Westminster Girls' Basketball won the Golden West league title in 1996, 1999, 2000, 2001, 2002, 2012, 2013, 2014, 2015, 2016 and 2018.

Westminster Boys' Tennis won the Golden West League title in 2011 and 2015.

Westminster Girls' Tennis won the Golden West League title in 2016 and made semifinals of CIF Division V 2018

Westminster Boys' JV Volleyball won the Golden West League title in 2009 and 2016.

Westminster Boys' Volleyball won the Golden West League title in 2015-2018.

Westminster Boys' Soccer won the Golden West League title in 2013

Westminster Football won the Golden West League titles in 2001, 2003, 2004, 2005, 2006, 2007, 2008, 2012, 2013 and 2014.

Westminster Badminton won CIF Division 2 in 2015 & 2016.

Westminster Badminton won CIF Division 1 in 2021.

Westminster Girls' Volleyball won the Golden West League in 2016 & 2022.

Westminster Girls' Soccer won the Golden West League in 2017, 2018, 2019, 2020, 2021 and 2022. They were CIF runners up in CIF Division 5.

Westminster Academic Decathlon team won 1st place in Division 3 State Competition in 2016.

Westminster Academic Decathlon team won 1st place in Division 2 State Competition in 2017.

Westminster Academic Decathlon team won 1st place in the Regionals Super Quiz in 2011 and 2018.

Westminster Academic Decathlon team won 1st place in Division 1 Regionals Competition in 2007, 2008, 2010, 2011, 2013, and 2015.

Westminster Wrestling was league champions in 2019, 2020, 2021 and 2022. They were the CIF Runners up in 2022.

Notable alumni

 Mark Eaton, former NBA All-Star player with the Utah Jazz for 12 seasons.
 Ryan Klesko, former MLB Player for 13 years with the Braves, Padres and Giants.
 Debbie Green-Vargas, Olympic volleyball player
 Penelope Spheeris, American director, producer, and screenwriter of SNL, Roseanne and "Wayne's World".
 Nguyen Cao Ky Duyen, co-host of Thuy Nga's Paris By Night
 Richard Brown (born 1965), Former NFL Player with the Rams, Chargers, Browns and Vikings.
 Jason Williams - star of the 1974 film Flesh Gordon class of 1965
 Van Tuinei - NFL career with the Chargers, Colts and Bears.
 Mick Mars (Bob Deal) of Mötley Crüe, class of 1969
 Carlos Palomino, World Welterweight Champ '77 - '79, class of 1970
 Greg Mahle, MLB player for the Los Angeles Angels
 Tyler Mahle, MLB player for the Cincinnati Reds
 Randy Steven Kraft convicted rapist and murderer, class of 1963
 Eddie Bane MLB player for the Minnesota Twins. Class of 1970
 Bill Tiller American computer game designer, writer, and artist. Class of 1987

References

External links

Westminster High School

Westminster High School Boys' Basketball

Educational institutions established in 1959
High schools in Orange County, California
Public high schools in California
Westminster, California
1959 establishments in California